Markus Theodor Mattmüller (born 18 July 1928 in Basel; died 30 October 2003 in Basel; originally from Basel) was a Swiss historian.

Biography
He was the son of pacifist activist Georg Mattmüller (1893–1951). He studied history as well as German and Italian language and literature at the universities of Basel and Perugia before he passed the Mittellehrerexamen in 1957. He qualified as a professor in 1966. From 1969 to 1992, he was an ordinary professor of General and Swiss Modern History at the University of Basel.

Among other things, he oversaw research works on demography and agricultural history of the Ancien Régime, as well as on the labour movement. He also produced work on Leonhard Ragaz and religious socialism.

Mattmüller was the Secretary of the Swiss Peace Council from 1951 to 1954. He was a Constituent Councillor of both Basel cantons from 1960 to 1969, and a judge at the Civil Court from 1964 to 1967.

Works (selection) 
 Leonhard Ragaz und der religiöse Sozialismus. Eine Biographie. 2 volumes. Zollikon: EVZ, 1957/1968 (also: dissertation, University of Basel, 1957).
 Bevölkerungsgeschichte der Schweiz. Teil I: Die frühe Neuzeit, 1500–1700 (= Basler Beiträge zur Geschichtswissenschaft. vol. 154). 2 volumes. Basel: Helbling und Lichtenhahn, 1987.

Bibliography

External links

 
 Markus Mattmüller, University of Basel Library

20th-century Swiss historians
Social historians
Academic staff of the University of Basel
Social Democratic Party of Switzerland politicians
Swiss pacifists
People from Basel-Stadt
1928 births
2003 deaths